Arkadiusz Gardzielewski (born 12 June 1986) is a Polish long-distance runner. He qualified to represent Poland at the 2020 Summer Olympics in Tokyo 2021, competing in men's marathon.

References

External links
 

 

1986 births
Living people
Polish male long-distance runners
Athletes (track and field) at the 2020 Summer Olympics
Olympic athletes of Poland
People from Tczew